The 2009–10 Serie A1 is the 91st season of the Serie A1, Italy's premier Water polo league.

Seasons in Italian water polo competitions
Italy
Serie A1
Serie A1
2009 in water polo
2010 in water polo